Marathi Christians are an Ethno-religious community of the Indian state of Maharashtra who accepted Christianity during the 18th and 19th centuries during the East India Company, and later, the British Raj. Conversions to Protestantism were a result of Christian missions such as the American Marathi Mission, Church Mission Society and the Church of England's United Society for the Propagation of the Gospel.

History

Around the turn of the 18th century, British Baptist missionary William Carey was instrumental in translating the Bible into the Marathi language. Most of the converts were lower-caste Hindus with some upper-caste Hindus and Muslims.

Ahmednagar

The American Board of Commissioners for Foreign Missions established their first foreign mission with the American Marathi mission in Bombay on 21 December 1813, it was the first Protestant Mission in Western India and spread into hundreds of villages. The mission center moved from Bombay to Ahmednagar in 1831 because it was closer to the center of Marathi country.  Schools, Boardings, Colleges and theological institutions were created by Marathi mission in late 1800, aiding famine and reaching untouchables increased Christian Converts in area.

Christians of Ahmednagar district account for nearly 10% of district's population, a significant number of whom are located in the eastern part of the district in places such as Nevasa, Pathardi, Shevgaon, Rahuri and Ahmednagar itself.

Palghar

European and American missionaries established missions in Palghar and Dahanu in Palghar district. Most of the converted Christian community from these areas are local native belong to the Second District of the Church of the Brethren (F-257 Bom).

Aurangabad
Aurangabad is home to The Roman Catholic Diocese of Aurangabad which has its Cathedral and Bishop’s House located in the Cantonment Area. The Diocese covers the whole of Marathwada and works mainly in field of Education, Health, and social work.

Yavatmal

The American Free Methodist Church maintains missions at Yavatmal, Wani, Umri, Rajur and Darwah.

Pune
The city of Pune is home to the headquarters of the Roman Catholic Diocese of Pune. The Diocese has a significant Marathi Catholic population. 

There are several Marathi Methodist, Anglican, Baptist, Seventh-Day Adventist, Church of the Nazarene, Pentecostal and Church of Christ missions across the city.

Culture

There are similarities of customs and culture between Hindus and Marathi Christians, such as dress, food and cuisine. The Hindu custom of wearing Saree, Mangalsutra and placing Bindis is still prominent among native Christians. Marathi Christian highly retain their Marathi culture, and they have kept their Pre-Christian surnames. In Maharashtra, great Marathi poet Narayan Wamanrao Tilak realised that a Hindu-Christian synthesis was simply not possible, unless the Christian religion had deep roots in the Indian culture. He trained the Marathi Christians to worship and sing Bhajan and Kirtan.

Notable people

 Pandita Ramabai 
 Narayan Waman Tilak
Shahu Modak, a Marathi/Hindi movie actor from Ahmednagar. He primarily acted as Lord Krishna in 29 mythological films.
Baba Padmanjii, a Brahmin and a Christian convert. An author of over 100 books, his Yamunaparyatan is considered the first novel of Marathi literature.
 Harish Salve, renowned Jurist.
 N. K. P. Salve, former Union Minister and Congress Leader from Vidarbha.
 Rajanikant Arole, Magasayse award winner and Padmabhushan.
Chandu Borde, a former cricket player from the Pune district. He played for the Indian cricket team in 83 matches between 1958 and 1969. His younger brother Ramesh was also a noteworthy cricket player.
Vijay Hazare, a cricket player from the Solapur district. He captained the Indian cricket team in fourteen matches between 1951 and 1953. He also captained Baroda, with whom he won the Ranji Trophy in 1959. Hazare is considered by many to be one of the best middle-order bats to play for India.
 Vinod Kambli, a former Indian international Cricketer, who played for India as a left-handed middle order batsman, as well as for Mumbai and Boland, South Africa.  Kambli converted to Catholicism after his second marriage.

See also
 Christianity in Maharashtra
 Kupari
 Marathi people
 Portuguese India
 List of Indian Christians

References

Christian communities of India
Christianity in Mumbai
Ethnic groups in Mumbai
Social groups of Maharashtra
Ethnoreligious groups in India
Maharashtra